Deltophora fuscomaculata is a moth of the family Gelechiidae. It is found in Korea.

References

Moths described in 1988
Deltophora